Caloptilia ovatiella is a moth of the family Gracillariidae. It is known from California, United States.

The larvae feed on Malosma laurina, Rhus integrifolia and Rhus ovata. They mine the leaves of their host plant.

References

External links
mothphotographersgroup

ovatiella
Moths of North America
Moths described in 1969